66 (sixty-six) is the natural number following 65 and preceding 67.

Usages of this number include:

In mathematics
66 is:

a sphenic number.
a triangular number.
a hexagonal number.
a semi-meandric number.
a semiperfect number, being a multiple of a perfect number.
an Erdős–Woods number, since it is possible to find sequences of 66 consecutive integers such that each inner member shares a factor with either the first or the last member.
palindromic and a repdigit in bases 10 (6610), 21 (3321) and 32 (2232)

In science

Astronomy
Messier object Spiral Galaxy M66, a magnitude 10.0 galaxy in the constellation Leo.
The New General Catalogue object NGC 66, a peculiar barred spiral galaxy in the constellation Cetus.
 66 Maja, a carbonaceous background asteroid from the central regions of the asteroid belt.

Physics
The atomic number of dysprosium, a lanthanide.

In computing
66 (more specifically 66.667) megahertz (MHz) is a common divisor for the front side bus (FSB) speed, overall central processing unit (CPU) speed, and base bus speed. On a Core 2 CPU, and a Core 2 motherboard, the FSB is 1066 MHz (~16 × 66 MHz), the memory speed is usually 666.67 MHz (~10 × 66 MHz), and the processor speed ranges from 1.86 gigahertz (GHz) (~66 MHz × 28) to 2.93 GHz (~66 MHz × 44), in 266 MHz (~66 MHz × 4) increments.

In motor vehicle transportation

The designation of the historic U.S. Route 66, dubbed the "Mother Road" by novelist John Steinbeck, and other roads.
Phillips 66, a brand of gasoline and service station in the United States.

In religion
The total number of chapters in the Bible Book of Isaiah.
The number of verses in Chapter 3 of the Book of Lamentations in the Old Testament.
The total number of books in the Protestant edition of the Bible (Old Testament and New Testament) combined.
In Abjad numerals, The Name Of Allah (الله) numeric value is 66.

In sports
The number of the laps of the Spanish Grand Prix.
The longest field goal made in NFL history was 66 yards and kicked by Justin Tucker.

In entertainment

Cinema
Sixty Six is a 2006 British movie about a bar mitzvah in London on the day of the 1966 World Cup final.
In the Star Wars movie series, Order 66 is a prepared order to the clone troopers to kill the Jedi commanding them.

Television
Route 66 was a popular US television series on CBS from 1960 to 1964.

Video games
In the video game Fullmetal Alchemist, elusive villain Barry the Chopper is imprisoned in cell number 66, which later becomes his alias when battling the brothers at Laboratory Five.

In other fields
The international direct dialing (IDD) code for Thailand.
The number of the French department Pyrénées-Orientales.
The name of a German card game, translated from sechsundsechzig (see Sixty-six (game)).
In telecommunications a 66 block is used to organize telephone lines.
Sergio Mendes and Brasil '66 was a 1960s group.
66 WNBC radio was a popular New York radio station, which became WFAN on 1 July 1987.
Lil B has a song entitled "OMG 66".
 "Sixty-Six" is a song by Pat Metheny (born 1954) from his 2020 album From This Place.
 Le 66 is an opérette in one act of 1856 with music by Jacques Offenbach and a French libretto by Pittaud de Forges and Laurencin.
In the horror genre and Western esotericism there are 66 legions of demons/spirits that Baal controls.

References

External links

Integers